Morals for Women (known in the UK as Farewell Party and in re-release as Big City Interlude) is a 1931 American pre-Code film produced and released by Tiffany Pictures, often considered a low budget studio. The film stars Bessie Love and Conway Tearle. It is preserved at the Library of Congress, has been released on DVD, and is in the public domain.

This film is a follow-up to Tiffany's 1925 silent Morals for Men, which also starred Conway Tearle and is also preserved at the Library of Congress.

Plot 
Stenographer and gold digger Helen Huston (Love) has a personal relationship with her employer Van Dyne (Tearle), who has set her up in an apartment on Park Avenue. Her childhood beau visits New York and proposes to her, which prompts her to return to her hometown and seek advice from her family. News of her living situation is the talk of her hometown. In defending Helen's honor, her younger brother injures the town bully and must pay his large hospital bill. Helen returns to her New York boss to get the money. Her hometown sweetheart interrupts one of her parties to see her, and even upon learning about Helen's relationship with her boss, he wants to marry her.

Cast

Reception 

The film received lukewarm reviews, and the morality of the story was questioned.

References

External links 
 
 
 
 
 
 

1931 drama films
1931 films
American black-and-white films
Films set in Manhattan
Public domain
Tiffany Pictures films